Kenneth Wade Fredette (born March 3, 1964) is a former member of the Maine House of Representatives.

Fredette is a Republican. In 2012, he was elected Minority Leader of the Maine House.

Fredette announced in June 2013 that he would not enter the 2014 race for the Republican nomination for Maine's Second Congressional District, citing family concerns.

Fredette announced his candidacy for Governor on September 6, 2017.

Early life and education 
Fredette was born in rural Maine on March 3, 1964, as one of five children in his family. In 1982 he graduated from East Grand High School in Danforth, Maine as class valedictorian.

Fredette earned a B.S. in accounting from the University of Maine at Machias in 1987. He received a J.D. from the University of Maine School of Law in 1994 and a Master of Public Administration from Harvard University's John F. Kennedy School of Government in 2010.

Non-partisan career 
Fredette has been a Tribal Prosecutor for the Penobscot Indian Nation. He is currently a practicing attorney, and a lieutenant colonel in the Air National Guard, where he serves as a Judge Advocate General.

Political career

Prior to 2010 
In 1985, Fredette was an intern for United States Senator Warren Rudman. In 1987 and 1988, he was on the campaign staff of presidential candidate Robert Dole, including being the New England Regional Youth Coordinator, In 1990 he was the field director of the campaign to re-elect Maine governor John R. McKernan.

Fredette was unsuccessful in his legislative races prior to 2010: In District 125 of the Maine State House of Representatives, in 1996 and 1998; in District 33 of the Maine State Senate, in 2004; and in District 28 of the Maine State Senate, in 2006.

2010 to present 

In his freshman term, 2011–2012, Fredette served on the Maine Legislature's budget-writing Appropriations and Financial Affairs Committee.

After being elected as House Republican Leader in November 2012, Fredette introduced bills requiring Temporary Assistance for Needy Families applicants to prove that they have applied for at least three jobs and eliminating the ability of DHHS caseworkers to use discretion in applying penalties to TANF recipients. He opposed the expansion of Medicaid in Maine. He also sponsored a bill that allocates funds for the use of electronic monitors on defendants in domestic violence cases.

Fredette commented in the Maine House on potential expansion of medicaid on June 12, 2013. He referenced the book Men Are from Mars, Women Are from Venus, contrasted a man's brain with women's, and questioned whether the proposed Medicaid expansion was "really free". Fredette apologized during the afternoon session in a speech on the House floor.

Fredette endorsed Sen. Marco Rubio for President in the 2016 election on July 2, 2015, while also announcing he would appear with Rubio in a Fourth of July parade in Wolfeboro, New Hampshire. He was also named the Rubio campaign's Maine chairman.

Personal

Fredette resides in Newport, Maine. and has two children.

Fredette is a past President of the Board of Directors of the Sebasticook Valley Federal Credit Union.

References

External links
 House Republican Biography
REP. KEN FREDETTE

1964 births
21st-century American politicians
Harvard Kennedy School alumni
Living people
Minority leaders of the Maine House of Representatives
Republican Party members of the Maine House of Representatives
People from Newport, Maine
People from Washington County, Maine
University of Maine at Machias alumni
University of Maine School of Law alumni